Below is a list of the historic German language exonyms for towns and village in the Alsace region of France (German: Elsaß) used prior to the annexation of the region by France during the reign of King Louis XIV of France in 1681 and again from 1870 to 1918 and from 1940 to 1945, when Alsace was re-annexed to Germany. Alsatian names used since the 6th century differ.

This list includes only names that differ significantly; the list of minor spelling differences, such as Zutzendorf/Zützendorf is incomplete. Included are names where the sole difference is -weiler instead of -willer, e.g. Dettwiller (French)/Dettweiler (German).

See also

Alsace
German exonyms
List of European exonyms

Alsace
Geography of Grand Est
German